Fatmata B. Turay, (born in 1987 in Freetown) is Sierra Leonean beauty queen who represented her country at Miss World 2007 in Sanya, China.  She studied medicine.

References

Miss World 2007 delegates
1987 births
Living people
Sierra Leonean female models
Temne people
Sierra Leonean beauty pageant winners
People from Freetown